The Reina Nacional de Belleza Miss República Dominicana 2009 pageant was held on September 27, 2008. That year only 18 candidates competed for the national crown. The chosen winner represents the Dominican Republic at the Miss International 2009 pageant which was held in Tokyo. The first runner up will represent the country in Miss Mesoamerica. The second runner up represents the country in Reina Nacional del Café.. The third runner up represents the country in Miss Atlantico. The fourth runner up represents the country in Miss Intercontinental.

Results

Special awards
 Miss Photogenic (voted by F3 by watchao, official photographer) - Stephanie Ruiz (Santo Domingo)
 Miss Congeniality (voted by contestants) - Mabel Valenzuela (Com. Dom. EU)
 Best Skin - Fatima de Paula (San Cristóbal)
 Best Provincial Costume - Mayerline Cruz (Santiago Rodríguez)
 Best Hair - Vicky Fernández (Santiago)
 Miss Internet (voted through www.reinanacionaldebelleza.com) - Stephanie Ruiz (Santo Domingo)
 Best Fashion Look - Jessica Salce (La Vega)
 Best Smile - Cenny Almonte (Valverde)
 Best Body - Jasmine Hernández (Monseñor Nouel)
 Most Beautiful Eyes - Jasmine Hernández (Monseñor Nouel)

Final Competition Scores

Delegates

Trivia
 Miss Puerto Plata entered in Miss Dominican Republic 2008.

References

External links
 http://blog.reinanacionaldebelleza.com/?page_id=131
 http://www.cibaoonline.eigentio.com/
 http://www.missrdus.com/

Miss Dominican Republic
2009 beauty pageants
2009 in the Dominican Republic